Betty Bailey may refer to:

 Betty G. Bailey (1939–2019), American artist
 Betty Lou Bailey (1929–2007), American mechanical engineer

See also
Elizabeth Bailey (disambiguation)